The head (pl. heads) is a ship's toilet. The name derives from sailing ships in which the toilet area for the regular sailors was placed at the head or bow of the ship.

Design

In sailing ships, the toilet was placed in the bow somewhat above the water line with vents or slots cut near the floor level allowing normal wave action to wash out the facility. Only the captain had a private toilet near his quarters, at the stern of the ship in the quarter gallery.

The plans of 18th-century naval ships do not reveal the construction of toilet facilities when the ships were first built. The Journal of Aaron Thomas aboard HMS Lapwing in the Caribbean Sea in the 1790s records that a canvas tube was attached, presumably by the ship's sailmaker, to a superstructure beside the bowsprit near the figurehead, ending just above the normal waterline.

In many modern boats, the heads look similar to seated flush toilets but use a system of valves and pumps that brings sea water into the toilet and pumps the waste out through the hull (in place of the more normal cistern and plumbing trap) to a drain. In small boats the pump is often hand operated. The cleaning mechanism is easily blocked if too much toilet paper or other fibrous material is put down the pan.

Submarine heads face the problem that at greater depths higher water pressure makes it harder to pump the waste out through the hull. As a result, early systems could be complicated, with the head fitted to the United States Navy S-class submarine being described as almost taking an engineer to operate. Making a mistake resulted in waste or seawater being forcibly expelled back into the hull of the submarine.

The toilet on the World War I British E-class submarine was considered so poor by the captain of  that he preferred the crew to wait to relieve themselves until the submarine surfaced at night. As a result, many submarines only used the heads as an extra storage space for provisions.

Aboard sailing ships and during the era when all hands aboard a vessel were men, the heads received most of their use for defecation; for routine urination, however, a pissdale was easier to access and simpler to use.

References

Ship compartments
Toilets